This page contains the filmography of Wong Jing.

Filmography

Television series

References

External links
Wong Jing at the Hong Kong Movie DataBase

Wong Jing at Hong Kong Cinemagic

Male actor filmographies
Hong Kong filmographies
British filmographies
Director filmographies